Fusarium redolens is a fungal plant pathogen infecting asparagus.

References

redolens
Fungal plant pathogens and diseases
Vegetable diseases
Fungi described in 1913